Mariam Ali Moussa is a Chadian diplomat. She has been her country's ambassador to Austria and to Germany. Previously she was an adviser to the President and a minister.

Life 
One of her first jobs was as a customs inspector at N'Djamena International Airport in 1988. In 1989 she moved into teaching and in 1991 she was a research assistant at the Canadian University of Moncton and two years later an Economist Assistant for a USAID related project concerned with Agriculture Marketing and Technology Transfer. In 1997 she became the finance lead for the Agence Tchadienne d’exécution des Travaux d’Intérêt Public when Youssouf Saleh Abbas was in charge.

Moussa has studied Business Administration and she speaks Arabic, French and English in addition to Gourane, Kanembou and Gambaye.

In 1998 she joined the office of the Prime Minister as an Advisor on Economic and Financial Affairs. In 2003 she was the President's Counsellor on Budget Affairs and the following year she became  Deputy General Secretary to the President. In 2005 she became a minister whose portfolio was "General Control and Moralization". In 2005/6 she was Deputy General Secretary Minister of Government and again in 2006 she was Minister of National Solidarity and Micro credit.

She was accredited as Chad's Ambassador to Germany in December 2018. This is an important link as France, Germany and latterly the European Union are the only European embassies in Chad.

In 2019 she was accepted as Chad's representative by Juan Carlos Lentijo at the International Atomic Energy Agency in Vienna.

In February 2020 she presented her credentials as the Ambassador to Austria to Austrian Federal President Alexander Van der Bellen in Hofburg. In 2021 Lassina Zerbo of the Comprehensive Nuclear-Test-Ban Treaty Organization recognised her as Chad's representative (this was done virtually because of the COVID-19 pandemic.)

References 

Living people
Year of birth missing (living people)
Chadian women diplomats
Chadian diplomats
Ambassadors of Chad to Austria
Ambassadors of Chad to Germany
Women ambassadors